Calcium deficiency may refer to:

Calcium deficiency, a plant disorder that can be caused by insufficient calcium in the growing medium, but is more frequently a product of low transpiration of the whole plant or more commonly the affected tissue
Hypocalcaemia, the presence of low serum calcium levels in the blood